Julia Carol Nixon (February 7, 1955 – September 29, 2021) was an American rhythm and blues singer.

Biography
Nixon was born Julia Carol McGirt in Rowland, North Carolina, on February 7, 1955. In the mid-1980s, she began leading a musical group called Julia & Company. The band had two singles that charted on the UK Singles Chart. "Breakin' Down (Sugar Samba)" reached #15 in March 1984, while "I'm So Happy" reached #56 in February 1985. 

Her first solo album was released in 2007. At the 2009 Wammies, she won the Urban Contemporary Vocalist Award and her ensemble, Julia & Company, won the Urban Contemporary Duo/Group Award.

Nixon died from complications related to COVID-19 in Raleigh on September 29, 2021, during the COVID-19 pandemic in North Carolina. She was 66 years old.

Discography

Studio album
 Keepin' On Track (2007)

Singles as Julia & Company

References

External links
 

1955 births
2021 deaths
American rhythm and blues singers
Deaths from the COVID-19 pandemic in North Carolina